This is a list of PlayStation Home Game Spaces that were released in the PlayStation Home Open Beta, with the exception of the two Far Cry 2 spaces and the Uncharted: Drake's Fortune space that were released during the Closed Beta. This page also includes the list of PlayStation Home Game Developer Spaces and the list of PlayStation Home Non-gaming Company Spaces. PlayStation Home started an open beta test on December 11, 2008, and closed on March 31, 2015.

Outso is a developing company that developed some of the Game Spaces for Home. Outso was responsible for making the Uncharted 2: Among Thieves, inFAMOUS, Resistance 2 and Warhawk spaces for the respective games developer. They also made the mini-games in those spaces as well as the SOCOM Telestrator in the SOCOM space.

Game Spaces
This list is for all of the Game Spaces that were released in PlayStation Home. Game Spaces generally depicted a level of the game itself and had mini-games or interactions related to the game and were used to promote the game. There were over thirty Game Spaces released in PlayStation Home from either Sony Computer Entertainment or various third party developers. Clap Hanz, Naughty Dog, Incognito Entertainment, Evolution Studios, Sucker Punch Productions, and Media Molecule are developing companies of SCE.

This list is in alphabetical order by their European and/or North American names.
These flags represent each region of Home.
 = Asian Home;  = European Home;   = Japanese Home;  = North American Home

Game Developer Spaces
This list is for all of the Game Developer Spaces that were released in the PlayStation Home Open Beta. Game Developer Spaces functioned similarly to Game Spaces except they were to promote the game developer themselves and several of their games instead of just one of their specific games. There were twelve Game Developer Spaces in Home from four game developers.

These flags represent each region of Home.
 = Asian Home;  = European Home;   = Japanese Home;  = North American Home

Non-gaming Company Spaces
This list is for all of the Non-gaming Company Spaces that were released in the PlayStation Home Open Beta. Non-gaming Company Spaces also functioned similarly to Game Spaces, however, these were to promote the company and its products. They may also have included mini-games that relate to the company. There were six Non-gaming Company Spaces in Home.

These flags represent each region of Home.
 = Asian Home;  = European Home;   = Japanese Home;  = North American Home

See also
PlayStation Home

References

External links
Official PlayStation Home websites Asia | Europe | Japan | North America

Home Game Spaces